The Ruvu weaver (Ploceus holoxanthus) is a species of bird in the family Ploceidae. It is endemic to eastern Tanzania. 

Initially described as a distinct species by Gustav Hartlaub in 1891, it was synonymized with the eastern golden weaver (P. subaureus) by the majority of later authorities. However, critical morphological analysis in 2021 confirmed it as being a distinct species. It can be generally distinguished from P. subaureus by the darker brown eye of the male and the lighter lower mandible of the female. 

It has a very restricted distribution in Tanzania, being only found along the Ruvu, Wami, and Rufiji river basins. Several colonies are known from the vicinity of Morogoro.

References

 Gill F, D Donsker & P Rasmussen  (Eds). 2022. IOC World Bird List (v12.1). doi :  10.14344/IOC.ML.12.1

Ruvu weaver
Ruvu weaver
Endemic birds of Tanzania